The 1956 Auckland City mayoral election was part of the New Zealand local elections held that same year. In 1956, elections were held for the Mayor of Auckland plus other local government positions including twenty-one city councillors. The polling was conducted using the standard first-past-the-post electoral method.

Background
Mayor John Luxford was challenged over his claim of wasteful expenditure by the Council by former Town Clerk Thomas Ashby who claimed Luxford had not remedied the problem with the programmes he had initiated. Ashby was endorsed by the United Independents electoral ticket after Luxford had joined the Citizens & Ratepayers ticket after a falling out with Robinson and his United Independent colleagues who had backed him in his 1953 campaign. The United Independents vote fell, losing their balance of power, with the Citizens & Ratepayers regaining their council majority once again.

Mayoralty results

Councillor results

 
 
 
 
 
 
 
 
 
 
 
 
 
 
 
 
 
 
 
 
 
 
 
 
 
 
 
 
 
 
 
 
 
 
 
 
 
 
 
 
 
 
 
 
 
 
 
 
 
 
 
 
 
 
 
 
 
 
 
 
 
 
 
  
 

 

Table footnotes:
<noinclude>

Notes

References

Mayoral elections in Auckland
1956 elections in New Zealand
Politics of the Auckland Region
1950s in Auckland
November 1956 events in New Zealand